General elections were held in Bangladesh on 12 June 1996. The result was a victory for the Bangladesh Awami League, which won 146 of the 300 seats, beginning Sheikh Hasina's first-term as Prime Minister. Voter turnout was 74.96%, the highest to date. This election was the second to be held in 1996, following controversial elections held in February a few months earlier.

Electoral system
In 1996, the 330 members of the Jatiya Sangsad consisted of 300 directly elected seats using first-past-the-post voting in single-member constituencies, and an additional 30 seats reserved for women. The reserved seats are distributed based on the election results. Each parliament sits for a five-year term.

Background 
The June 1996 election marked the second general election to be held within only a four-month period. Previously in February, a general election had been held which was boycotted by all major opposition parties. The opposition were demanding the installation of a neutral caretaker government to oversee the election, citing a 1994 by-election (which they alleged to have been rigged) as evidence of the BNP's inability to hold a free and fair election. Despite the boycott the February election went ahead and the incumbent Prime Minister Khaleda Zia's BNP was re-elected for the second term in a landslide victory, with the majority of seats uncontested. The voting was denounced as unfair by the three main opposition parties and the voter turnout was the lowest in Bangladesh's parliamentary electoral history at only 21%. 

Following the election, President Abdur Rahman Biswas invited Zia to form a government, but this administration was short-lived, lasting only 12 days. A series of hartals (strikes) were called by the other parties and an indefinite non-cooperation movement was called until demands for a new, free election was met. On 25 March 1996, following escalating political turmoil, the sitting Parliament enacted the thirteenth constitutional amendment to allow a neutral caretaker government to assume power and conduct new parliamentary elections. On 30 March the President appointed former Chief Justice Muhammad Habibur Rahman as Chief Advisor (a position equivalent to prime minister) in the interim government. A new election was scheduled for 12 June 1996.

Campaign
During the election campaign there was an attempted coup d'état by the military. On 12 May, President Biswas fired General Abu Saleh Mohammad Nasim, Chief of the Staff of the Army, due to his refusal to carry out a presidential order to retire two of his generals who were alleged to be consorting with political parties in violation of military rules. Nasim revolted against the President and organised troops loyal to him. Consequently, President Biswas dismissed Nasim and appointed a new chief of staff. Troops loyal to the President were mobilised to protect Government institutions in the capital and Nasim was arrested by military police and the attempted coup d'état failed.

A total of 2,574 candidates contested the elections. The Awami League, Bangladesh Nationalist Party and Jamaat-e-Islami Bangladesh all put forward full slates of 300 candidates. The Jatiya Party ran 293 candidate, Islami Oikkya Jote 166 and Jatiya Samajtantrik Dal (Rab) 67, with other minor parties nominating a combined 864 candidates. 284 candidates ran as independents.

Results
The elections were won by the Bangladesh Awami League, who were just shy of a simple parliamentary majority, winning 146 (of the required 151 for a majority) seats. The election was close in terms of popular vote share between Awami League and BNP, with a difference of less than 4%. However, as a result of first-past-the-post voting, Awami League secured a 30-seat lead above BNP. The election saw a high voter turnout of ~74%.

With the support of Jatiya Party, the leader of Awami League, Sheikh Hasina, was invited to form a government on 23 June, beginning her first term as Prime Minister. The first sitting of the seventh parliament of Bangladesh was subsequently held on 14 July 1996.

Of the 300 directly elected seats, only eight were won by female candidates. An additional 30 seats were reserved in the Jatiya Sangsad for women, of which 27 were awarded to Awami League and rest to Jatiya Party.

Aftermath
Hasina's administration completed its full five-year term (the first parliamentary administration to ever do so) and the next elections were held in October 2001.

References

General
1996 06
Bangladesh
General